Edward North "Robbie" Robinson (October 15, 1873 – March 10, 1945) was an American football and baseball coach. He served as the head football coach at University of Nebraska–Lincoln, Brown University, University of Maine, and Tufts College—now known as Tufts University, and co-head football coach at Boston University. He also coached for the Providence Steam Roller of the National Football League. He was inducted into the College Football Hall of Fame in 1955.

Early life
Robinson was born in Sabattus, Maine, and attended Danvers High School the Dean Academy. He played halfback for the Brown Bears football team and was a pitcher and right field for the Brown Bears baseball team. Robinson was selected by Walter Camp in 1895 as a Third Team All-American. He graduated from Brown in 1896 and earned a degree from the Boston University School of Law in 1898.

Coaching

Football
Robinson began his coaching career at Nebraska. He compiled a 11-4-1 record over two seasons and led Nebraska to its ever first conference championship. He then coached at his alma mater from 1898 to 1901. He coached at the University of Maine in 1902 and at Phillips Exeter Academy in 1903. He returned to Brown in 1904 and remained there until 1907. After one year as the head coach at Tufts, he returned to Brown for his third stint as head coach. In 1923 he turned down the opportunity to become the head coach of the Alabama Crimson Tide football team. Robinson and his assistant Reggie Brown were let go after the 1925 season, ending his 24 year tenure as Brown’s head coach. On April 2, 1926, athletic director George V. Brown hired Robinson and Brown to coach the Boston University football team. They served as co-head coaches of BU until 1930, when they were replaced by Hilary Mahaney. In 1931, Robinson coached the Providence Steam Roller of the National Football League. Under Robinson, the Steam Roller finished the 1931 season 4–4–3 record.

Baseball
In 1901, Robinson was hired to coach baseball at Yale University. The following year he led the Phillips Exeter baseball team to a championship. He was retained by Phillips Exeter for the following season and given the additional role as head football coach.

Later life
A longtime resident of Danvers, Massachusetts, Robinson spent his later years in Boston's Brighton neighborhood and was in charge of football for the Boston Parks Department. He died on March 10, 1945, at Corey Hill Hospital in Brookline, Massachusetts.

Head coaching record

College football

References

External links
 

1873 births
1945 deaths
19th-century players of American football
American football halfbacks
Boston University School of Law alumni
Boston University Terriers football coaches
Brown Bears baseball players
Brown Bears football coaches
Brown Bears football players
College Football Hall of Fame inductees
Dean College alumni
High school baseball coaches in the United States
High school football coaches in New Hampshire
Maine Black Bears football coaches
Nebraska Cornhuskers baseball coaches
Nebraska Cornhuskers football coaches
People from Androscoggin County, Maine
People from Danvers, Massachusetts
Players of American football from Massachusetts
Providence Steam Roller coaches
Tufts Jumbos football coaches
Yale Bulldogs baseball coaches